Encinas de Abajo is a village and municipality in the province of Salamanca, Spain, which is  part of the autonomous community of Castile-Leon.

Geography
The postal code is 37182.

Economy
The basis of the economy is agriculture.

See also
List of municipalities in Salamanca

References

External links
 Summary page of Encinas de Abajo 

Municipalities in the Province of Salamanca